Francis Eastward Tinley (3 March 1819 – 2 June 1889) was an English first-class cricketer active 1844–56 who played for Nottinghamshire. He was born in Southwell; died in Birmingham.

References

1819 births
1889 deaths
English cricketers
Nottinghamshire cricketers
North v South cricketers
Gentlemen of Southwell cricketers
Nottingham Cricket Club cricketers
Non-international England cricketers
All-England Eleven cricketers